Akbarpur Kalan is a village in Nakodar tehsil in Jalandhar district of Indian state of Punjab. Akbarpur Kalan is  far from its Mandal Main Town Nakodar. Akbarpur Kalan is located  distance from its district headquarters of Jalandhar - West . It is located  distance from the state Chandigarh.
Akbarpur Kalan lies on the Shahkot-Mehatpur road at a distance of 2 km from it.

Post Code
Akbarpur Kalan's PIN code is 144041.

References

Villages in Jalandhar district
Villages in Nakodar tehsil